"Hermann ♥'s Pauline"  is the sixth single by Super Furry Animals and the first to be released from their second album Radiator. It reached #26 on the UK Singles Chart on its release in May 1997.

Hermann and Pauline are the names of the parents of Albert Einstein, and the song refers to them and the young Albert. The song also mentions Marie Curie and Ernesto Guevera. The song was inspired by the pitstops that the band would take at motorway service stations whilst out on tour, where Gruff Rhys would peruse through bitesized biographies about famous people, such as They Died Too Young book series.

The band had trouble playing the track live and stopped playing it altogether until the Phantom Power tour when they realised that trying to play along to a click track was the cause of the problem.

Release

"Hermann ♥'s Pauline" was released on CD, cassette and 7" on 12 May 1997 and reached number 26 on the UK Singles Chart. The cover art is the first in a series of five Pete Fowler paintings commissioned by the band for Radiator and its singles. Fowler's art was inspired by "Hermann ♥'s Pauline" and features the title characters with their baby, who looks like Albert Einstein. The packaging of the single features the Welsh language quote "Un i rannu, llall i ddewis", which roughly translates into English as "One to share, the other to choose". This quote is a principle taken from the Laws of Hywel Dda which also appears in the lyrics of the album track "Download" from Radiator. "Hermann ♥'s Pauline" was included on the band's 'greatest hits' compilation album Songbook: The Singles, Vol. 1, issued in 2004.

Track listing

All songs by Super Furry Animals.

CD (CRESCD252)
"Hermann ♥'s Pauline"   – 4:07
"Calimero" – 2:23
"Trôns Mr Urdd" – 4:36
MC (CRECS252), 7" (CRE252)
"Hermann ♥'s Pauline"   – 4:07
"Calimero" – 2:23

Personnel
Gruff Rhys – vocals, guitar, backing vocals
Huw Bunford – guitar, backing vocals
Guto Pryce – bass guitar, sub-bass
Cian Ciaran – synthesizers, backing vocals
Dafydd Ieuan – drums, percussion, backing vocals

Singles chart positions

References

Super Furry Animals songs
Creation Records singles
1997 singles
1997 songs
Songs about Albert Einstein
Songs about parenthood